SH3 and PX domain-containing protein 2A is a protein that in humans is encoded by the SH3PXD2A gene.

References

Further reading